The 2001 Summer Deaflympics, officially known as the 19th Summer Deaflympics, is an international multi-sport event that was celebrated from July 16 to August 1, 2001, in Rome, Italy.

Venues 

Stadio Olimpico – Athletics, Football
Palazzetto dello Sport – Badminton, Basketball, Volleyball
Riano – Basketball
Albano – Basketball
Baths of Caracalla – Cycling
Stadio Flamino – Football
Campo Acqua Acetosa – Football
Lungotevere Acqua Acetosa – Bowling
Campo Tre Fontane – Football
Campo Maneggio – Handball
Monte Livata – Orienteering
Poligono "Umberto I°" – Shooting
Piscina Coni – Swimming
Palesta Tre Fontane – Table tennis
Foro Italico – Tennis, Water polo
Monterotondo – Volleyball
Palafilpjk – Wrestling

Medal Tally

References 

 
Deaflympics
International sports competitions hosted by Italy
Sports competitions in Rome
Deaflympics
Deaflympics
Deaflympics
Multi-sport events in Italy
Summer Deaflympics
Summer Deaflympics
Summer Deaflympics, 2001